The United States House of Representatives elections in California, 1864 were elections for California's delegation to the United States House of Representatives, which occurred as part of the general election of the House of Representatives on November 8, 1864. California's all-Republican delegation was unchanged.  This was the first election in which California was divided into districts.  Formerly, all three seats were elected at-large.

Results

District 1

District 2

District 3

See also 
39th United States Congress
Political party strength in California
Political party strength in U.S. states
United States House of Representatives elections, 1864

References 
California Elections Page
Office of the Clerk of the House of Representatives

External links 
California Legislative District Maps (1911-Present)
RAND California Election Returns: District Definitions

1864
California United States House of Representatives
1864 California elections